Water polo was contested for men only at the 1954 Asian Games in Manila, Philippines.

Medalists

Results

Preliminary round

Group A

Group B

Final round

5th medal match

Bronze medal match

Final

Final standing

References
 Asian Games water polo medalists

 
1954 Asian Games events
1954
Asian Games
1954 Asian Games